is a Japanese weightlifter. He competed at the 1956 Summer Olympics, the 1960 Summer Olympics and the 1964 Summer Olympics.

References

1938 births
Living people
Japanese male weightlifters
Olympic weightlifters of Japan
Weightlifters at the 1956 Summer Olympics
Weightlifters at the 1960 Summer Olympics
Weightlifters at the 1964 Summer Olympics
Sportspeople from Fukushima Prefecture
20th-century Japanese people